Salinispora tropica is an obligate marine actinomycete bacterium species. It produces salinosporamide A and salinosporamide B, potential anti-cancer agents, as well as the polycyclic macrolides sporolide A and B.

See also
 Salinispora arenicola
 Salinispora pacifica

References

Further reading

External links 
 LPSN

WORMS entry
Type strain of Salinispora tropica at BacDive -  the Bacterial Diversity Metadatabase

Micromonosporaceae
Bacteria described in 2005
Marine microorganisms